Nellitheertha Cave Temple in Nellitheertha, Karnataka, India is dedicated to the Indian deity Sri Somanatheshwara, or Shiva. The temple dates back to at least 1487 CE.

Access is restricted, forcing visitors to crawl in on their knees. Inside, there is a lake and a Shiva Lingam.

Origins 
It is believed that the cave in Nellitheertha was used by Sage Jabali to perform a penance to appease Goddess Durga Parameshwari. Goddess Durga appeared in front of Sage Jabali and assured him that she would kill the demon Arunasura. She later took the shape of a bumble bee and killed Arunasura on the banks of the river Nandini. At that place today is a beautiful temple of Goddess Durgaparameshwari and the place is very well known as Kateel.

Goddess Durga also assured Sage Jabali that Shiva, Vishnu and Durga herself would grace that region and that there would be temples to worship all three of them in the vicinity. One can find a Vishnu temple near Nellitheertha at a place called Kompadavu. Goddess Durga is worshipped in a place called Muchur, again near Nellitheertha. And Lord Shiva made Nellitheertha his abode.

Reaching Nellitheertha 
There are several routes to reach Nellitheertha.

 From Mangalore, take the route towards Moodabidri. Travel beyond Gurupura, Kaikamba and reach Yedapadavu.  Here, take a deviation towards Muchur.  Nellitheertha is 8 km away from Yedapadavu.
 Reach Bajpe from Mangalore and take the route to Kathelsaar. Continue on the same road to reach Nellitheertha.
 Reach Kateel from Mangalore. Nellitheertha is about 5 km away from Kateel.
 While driving from Bangalore, one can take a deviation at B C Road and go through Polali and Kaikamba and reach Nellitheertha. This avoids having to travel through Mangalore.
 While driving from Bangalore, one can take a deviation at B C Road and go through Kuppepadavu, Yedapadavu and reach Nellitheertha. This also avoids having to travel through Mangalore.

See also 
 Indian rock-cut architecture
 List of India cave temples

References

External links 

 Nellitheertha Somanatheshwara Cave Temple New webpage
 Nellitheertha Somanatheshwara Cave Temple main webpage
 Nellitheertha - A Hidden Jewel Waiting to be Discovered

Hindu cave temples in Karnataka
Shiva temples in Karnataka
Hindu temples in Dakshina Kannada district
15th-century Hindu temples
1487 establishments in Asia
15th-century establishments in India
Geography of Dakshina Kannada district